This is a list of episodes from 2020 for the Stuff You Should Know podcast.

2020 season
 Short Stuff (2020)

References

External links 
 Podcast Archive

Lists of radio series episodes